The 2021–22 LEN Champions League was the 59th edition of LEN's premier competition for men's water polo clubs.

Teams

Schedule
The schedule of the competition is as follows.

Qualifying rounds

Qualification round I
The draw took place in Šibenik during the women's LEN European Junior Water Polo Championship. The top four ranked sides will advance from both groups.

Group A
23–26 September 2021, Savona, Italy.

Group B
22–26 September 2021, Podgorica, Montenegro.

Qualification round II
The top two ranked sides from each group advance.

Group C
8–10 October 2021, Szolnok, Hungary.

Group D
8–10 October 2021, Zagreb, Croatia.

Group E
8–10 October 2021, Paris, France.

Group F
8–10 October 2021, Split, Croatia.

Qualification round III
The winners in the third round will continue in the preliminary round. The losers in the third round will be transferred in the Euro Cup quarter-finals.

|}

Preliminary round

The draw for the 2021–22 LEN Champions League preliminary round took place in Ostia, Italy. The upcoming season is planned with the usual pre-pandemic round-robin format with 14 rounds contested on a home-and-away basis. The top three teams in group A and the top four teams in group B will advance to the Final 8. Also, Novi Beograd will participate in the Final 8 as the host of tournament. The matchdays will be from 26 October 2021 to 15 June 2022.

Group A

Group B

Final 8

Marco Del Lungo, Francesco Di Fulvio, Luka Loncar, Gergő Zalánki, Aaron Younger, Alessandro Velotto, Nicholas Presciutti, Gonzalo Echenique, Aleksandar Ivović, Benjamin Thomas, Matteo Aicardi, Stefano Luongo, Tommaso Negri

Head coach
Sandro Sukno

Awards

See also
2021–22 LEN Euro Cup

References

Notes

External links
, len.microplustiming.com

 
LEN Champions League seasons
2021 in water polo
2022 in water polo
LEN Champions League
LEN Champions League